Husky Dome is a snow dome rising to , marking the highest point of the Husky Heights, between the heads of Brandau Glacier and Ramsey Glacier in the Queen Maud Mountains of Antarctica. It was named by the New Zealand Geological Survey Antarctic Expedition, 1961–62, after their Husky dogs which they drove to the summit of this feature.

References

Mountains of the Ross Dependency
Dufek Coast